The Fever is a 2004 psychological drama film produced by HBO Films, directed by Carlo Gabriel Nero and based on the 1990 play of the same name by Nero and actor Wallace Shawn.

The film stars the director's mother, Vanessa Redgrave, and includes cameos by Angelina Jolie, the director's half-sister Joely Richardson and Oscar-winning documentary filmmaker Michael Moore.

Background
The original play was a piece of experimental theater performed as a monologue by the play's author, Wallace Shawn.  Unlike conventional plays, Shawn initially performed The Fever not in a theater, but in private homes by appointment.  Later, he performed the piece in a theater, but in keeping with the desire to be unconventional in presentation, Shawn eschewed theatrical lighting, sets, and theater programs, and mingled with the audience immediately before the play began.  In an interview with The Paris Review, Shawn explained that he used these novel approaches to avoid people dismissing the play's message as merely "great theater."

Plot
The film follows the existential crisis of an unnamed urban sophisticate (Vanessa Redgrave) who becomes aware of the nature of world politics, economic exploitation and the vapid consumerism around her. A series of events lead her to visit an unnamed third world country, representing an exotic location somewhere in Eastern Europe, where the entire economy and populace are geared towards the tourist industry. Even as she enjoys the rare taste of its products she is made starkly aware of the reality behind the façade by a journalist (Michael Moore) who, subsequently, suggests a visit to the country's war-torn neighbour in order to experience a true picture of life in the region. She does so and her life is changed forever.

Once back, and now acutely attuned to the world about her, she can no longer fit back into her old elitist and consumer-driven lifestyle; watching operas, discussing art and theatre with friends, shopping for "beautiful things" and aggrandizing her  trifling everyday struggles, all seem meaningless to her compared with her recent macro epiphany. Compared with the global struggle for existence, her life begins to feel insignificant. Having lived in the bubble her guilt-free, pleasure-filled, life she is now challenged to look beyond comfort and soon finds herself in the throes of a moral dilemma, questioning the moral consistency of her own life and the choices that have affected the lives of the poor in far corners of the globe. She feels that she cannot be truly free having apprehended this new reality, which confronts her blindness to  the harsh truths of the class struggle and her sense of entitlement, which had, in the past, been broken, only occasionally, by displays of sympathy.

She returns to the war-torn nation to explore her feelings further, this new reality now drawing her ever-deeper. This leads to a delirious bout of fever in a run-down hotel where her inner-self challenges her need for comfort and entitlement, culminating in a moment of spiritual awakening and a perceived 'oneness' with all reality. Finally she sees the truth about her own life and her innate connection with every human being, apprehending the transient nature of her material life. She can no longer sit, immersed in her personal comforts and vanity, or "clean sheets" as she terms it, and pretend it’s all right when the world around her is filled with strife and exploitation for millions of people. She is lustrated of her previous immunity towards their predicament and is, by extension, finally able to see the truth of own life, as summarised by film's tag-line: Enlightenment Can Be Brutal.

Cast
 Vanessa Redgrave - Woman
 Angelina Jolie - Revolutionary
 Michael Moore - Reporter
 Joely Richardson - Woman at 30

Production
Parts of the film was shot in Snowdonia and Penmon, Anglesey in North Wales to represent locations in Eastern Europe

Awards
 2005: Bratislava International Film Festival:Grand Prix: Carlo Gabriel Nero: Nominated
 2008: Screen Actors Guild Awards: Outstanding Performance by a Female Actor in a Television Movie or Miniseries: Vanessa Redgrave: Nominated

Reception
A review in The New York Times describes Shawn's play as a "controversial study of the growing chasm between the first and third world."  The same newspaper describes the film adaptation as "a drama that employs animation and thought-provoking first-person monologues to explore the concept of bourgeois privilege."

References

External links
 
 
 Redgrave laid low by HBO's heavy "Fever" Review by Reuters
 Vanessa Redgrave will visit Cuba (for premiere of The Fever) Cuba News Headlines

2004 films
American psychological drama films
2000s political films
HBO Films films
Films shot in England
British films based on plays
American films based on plays
Films shot in Croatia
Films produced by Jason Blum
Films with screenplays by Wallace Shawn
Blumhouse Productions films
British political films
2000s English-language films
2000s American films
2000s British films